Michael Ross Kakooza is a Ugandan Rhythm and blues musician and dancer.

Early life and education
Michael Ross was born in Kampala in 1982 in a family of 14, Joseph and Immaculate Kasibante.

Music
Michael Ross started out as a dancer at the age of eight. He released his first single "Senorita" in 2002, receiving massive airplay. The song won the award for best R and B song in the 2003 Pearl of Africa Music Awards. He followed it with other songs including "You're the one" which he sang in English. To appeal to a broader Ugandan audience, Ross started singing in Luganda. he released songs like "Yooyo" " Nze Akwagala" and "Ndi nowange". He continued singing in English. He released songs like "Tell me" featuring Navio (rapper) and "Gimme tonight" that were well received. In 2006 he reseased his album to date "Yo the one". In 2012, he released "Clothes off" which received massive airplay on MTV base. He also released his second album "unstoppable".

Discography

Singles
Senorita
You're the one
Yooyo
Tell me 
Gimme tonight
Ndi nowange
Its over now

Albums
Yo The One, 2006
Unstoppable, 2012

Awards and recognition
Best RnB single for "Senorita" in Pearl of Africa Music Awards, 2003,( 2009 Buzz Teeniez Award) for Flyest Video "Tell Me " featuring Navio. 2008 Kora award Nominee,2010 Kisima Award Nominee.

References 

1982 births
Living people
21st-century Ugandan male singers
People from Kampala
Kumusha